The Third Day is an EP by the English rock band Wire. It was released in 2000.

Track listing

Personnel 
 Wire
 Bruce Gilbert – guitar
 Robert Gotobed – drums
 Graham Lewis – bass guitar, vocals
 Colin Newman – guitar, vocals

 Production
 Denis Blackham – mastering
 Colin Newman – mixing

References

External links 
 

2000 EPs
Wire (band) EPs